Thiomonas arsenitoxydans is a Gram-negative, moderately acidophilic, non-spore-forming, rod-shaped, motile bacterium from the genus Thiomonas, which has the ability to use arsenite as an energy source by oxidizing it.

References

External links
Type strain of Thiomonas arsenitoxydans at BacDive -  the Bacterial Diversity Metadatabase

Comamonadaceae
Bacteria described in 2011